"Breathe a Sigh" is a 1996 song by English hard rock band Def Leppard from their album Slang. It peaked at #43 on the U.K. Singles Chart. The single was not accompanied with a music video.

Background
In reference to the song, lead singer Joe Elliott said in the album's commentary that Breathe a Sigh is "a massive challenge for [him] to sing" and was "tried a lot of different ways [in the studio], but none of them ever seemed to do it any justice", so Def Leppard "stripped it right back" The song has not been played live since the Slang World Tour in 1997.

Track listing

CD: Bludgeon Riffola - Mercury / LEPCX18( UK) / 578 841-2 
 "Breathe a Sigh"
 "Another Hit & Run" (live)
 "All I Want Is Everything" (live)
 "Work It Out" (live)

CD: Bludgeon Riffola - Mercury / LEPCD18 (UK) / 578 839-2
 "Breathe a Sigh"
 "Rock! Rock! (Till You Drop)" (live)
 "Deliver Me" (Live)
 "Slang" (live)

Charts

References

Def Leppard songs
1996 singles
1996 songs
Songs written by Phil Collen